Blue Skies may refer to:

Art, entertainment, and media

Film
Blue Skies (1929 film), a 1929 American drama film
Blue Skies (1946 film), a 1946 musical film starring Bing Crosby and Fred Astaire
Blue Skies (2002 film), a 2002 Canadian short drama film directed by Ann Marie Fleming

Music

Albums
Blue Skies (Decca album), a 1946 album by Bing Crosby and Fred Astaire
Blue Skies (Bing Crosby album) (1962), volume 10 of the Bing's Hollywood collection
Blue Skies (Frank Ifield album), 1964
Blue Skies (Stan Getz album), 1995
Blue Skies (Cassandra Wilson album), 1988
Blue Skies (Bryan Duncan album), 1996
Blue Skies (Diana DeGarmo album), 2004
Blue Skies (Virginians album), 2008
Blue Skies (Seth MacFarlane album), 2022
Blue Skies (Dehd album), 2022

Songs
"Blue Skies" (Irving Berlin song), 1926
"Blue Skies" (BT song), 1996
"Blue Skies" (Noah and the Whale song), 2009
"Blue Skies" (Jamiroquai song), 2010
"Blue Skies" (Lenka song), 2015
"Blue Skies", by A-ha from the album Hunting High and Low
"Blue Skies", by Blackpool Lights from the album This Town's Disaster
"Blue Skies", by Bobby Vinton from the album Blue on Blue
"Blue Skies", by Tom Waits from the album The Early Years Vol. 2

Television
Blue Skies (1994 TV series), a 1994 sitcom starring Corey Parker and Matt Roth
Blue Skies (1988 TV series), a 1988 American drama series

Other uses
Blue skies research

See also 
 Big Sky (disambiguation)
Blue Sky (disambiguation)
 Sky blue